Antal Rogán (born 29 January 1972) is a Hungarian economist and politician, who served as Mayor of Belváros-Lipótváros (fifth district of Budapest) from 2006 to 2014.

He became a member of the National Assembly (MP) in the 1998 parliamentary election. He had been leader of the Fidesz parliamentary group since 2 June 2012. Rogán was appointed Minister of the newly-formed Prime Minister's Cabinet Office on 17 October 2015.

Personal life
He is married. Rogán's family is Slovene descent from the Raba March in Vas County. His first wife was Alexandra Sonnevend. His second wife was Cecília Gaál Rogán. He has three sons, Dániel, Áron and András.
He got married for the third time.

See also
Szabolcs Kerék-Bárczy

References

1972 births
Living people
Hungarian economists
Hungarian people of Slovenian descent
Fidesz politicians
Government ministers of Hungary
Members of the National Assembly of Hungary (1998–2002)
Members of the National Assembly of Hungary (2002–2006)
Members of the National Assembly of Hungary (2006–2010)
Members of the National Assembly of Hungary (2010–2014)
Members of the National Assembly of Hungary (2014–2018)
Members of the National Assembly of Hungary (2018–2022)
Members of the National Assembly of Hungary (2022–2026)
Mayors of places in Hungary
People from Körmend
Members of the Fourth Orbán Government
Members of the fifth Orbán government